Peter Julius Tallberg (15 July 1937 – 16 May 2015) was a Finnish sailor who competed in the 1960 Summer Olympics, in the 1964 Summer Olympics, in the 1968 Summer Olympics, in the 1972 Summer Olympics, and in the 1980 Summer Olympics.

He was a member of International Olympic Committee since 1976. At the time of his death in 2015, his tenure was the second longest among members, after Vitali Smirnov. Tallberg died of cancer on 16 May 2015 at the age of 77.

References

External links
 

1937 births
2015 deaths
Finnish male sailors (sport)
Olympic sailors of Finland
International Olympic Committee members
Sailors at the 1960 Summer Olympics – 5.5 Metre
Sailors at the 1964 Summer Olympics – Star
Sailors at the 1968 Summer Olympics – Star
Sailors at the 1972 Summer Olympics – Soling
Sailors at the 1980 Summer Olympics – Star
Swedish-speaking Finns
Nyländska Jaktklubben sailors
Presidents of World Sailing
Finnish sports executives and administrators
Sportspeople from Helsinki